Harrie Cross (26 February 1893 – 18 March 1958) was  a former Australian rules footballer who played with Collingwood in the Victorian Football League (VFL).

Notes

External links 

		
Harrie Cross's profile at Collingwood Forever

1893 births
1958 deaths
Australian rules footballers from Melbourne
Collingwood Football Club players
People from Collingwood, Victoria